Chornohora is the highest mountain range in Western Ukraine. It is within the Polonynian Beskids, a subgroup of the mountain group of Eastern Beskids, which in turn is part of the Outer Eastern Carpathians.

Description

The range is located on the administrative border between Ivano-Frankivsk and Zakarpattia oblasts. It is adjacent to the Gorgany range. The highest peak of Chornohora is Hoverla (2,061 m) with other high peaks including Pip Ivan (2,022 m) and Petros (2,020 m). The mountains are made of flysch rock.

The major part of the range forms the watershed between the Prut and Tysa River.  The lower parts of Chornohora are inhabited by Hutsuls, whose primary occupation is herding.  Major tourist centres of Chornohora are Bystrets, Dzembronia, Rakhiv, Verkhovyna, Vorokhta and Yasinia.

In 1968 on the southern macroslope was established the Carpathian Biosphere Reserve, and in 1980 on the northern macroslope the Carpathian National Nature Park.

List of peaks

See also

References

Sources

External links

 Carpathian Mountains: Division (map)
 Ukrainian Carpathian Mountains photos

Mountain ranges of the Eastern Carpathians
Mountain ranges of Ukraine
Primeval Beech Forests in Europe